Project Zero is the name of a team of security analysts employed by Google to find zero-day exploits.

Project Zero may also refer to:
 The experimental software development community in which new versions of WebSphere sMash are incubated
 AgustaWestland Project Zero, a VTOL technology demonstrator aircraft
 Project Zero, a Harvard project to study and improve education, initiated 1967 by Nelson Goodman
 Fatal Frame, a series of video games also known as Project Zero in Europe

See also
 Vision Zero